Ben Drowned (originally published as Haunted Majora's Mask Cartridge) is a three-part multimedia alternate reality game (ARG) web serial and web series created by Alexander D. Hall under the pen name Jadusable. Originating as a creepypasta based on the 2000 action-adventure game The Legend of Zelda: Majora's Mask and published by Hall from 2010 to 2020 with a hiatus in-between, the series is known for creating many of the common tropes and themes of creepypasta that are used nowadays and for subverting themes from The Legend of Zelda series. The series concluded on October 31, 2020.

Serving as Hall's first project, the first arc of the series titled Haunted Cartridge was released in 2010. It follows college sophomore Jadusable, who, after acquiring a haunted Nintendo 64 video game cartridge of Majora's Mask, is plagued over the course of a single week by the presence of a seemingly omniscient artificial intelligence called BEN. The second arc, titled Moon Children and taking place from late 2010 to early 2011, follows the public emergence of a mysterious cult known as The Moon Children, who worshipped the Moon by way of human sacrifice, or in their words, ascension. The third arc, titled Awakening, began in March 2020, following new and returning characters who have become involved in multiple events of the current year. This arc introduced new scenarios detailing the aftermath of an in-universe event in 2018 that caused the collapse of civilized society, as well as continuing stories established in the previous arcs with the intent of tying them together.

The series is one of the most popular web serials on the internet, with a viewership in the millions, and has been widely recognized as both an example of a modern urban legend and a major influence in helping to establish and legitimize creepypasta as a literary genre, creating many of the recognizable tropes that are now seen today in modern internet horror stories.

Publication
In June 2009, Hall uploaded two videos to his YouTube channel; one featuring a conversation with the minor character Rosa from the 2004 action role-playing game Vampire: The Masquerade – Bloodlines and one featuring the main character Alex Mercer from the 2009 action-adventure game Prototype. These videos were retconned as the first installments in the Haunted Majora's Mask Cartridge series in the second arc, The Moon Children, in which characters named Rosa and Alex, each with themes mirroring their respective videos, are introduced. 

Ben Drowned was first published as an online serial and web series with chapters released daily between September 7 and September 15, 2010, on 4chan's /x/ board. This first arc came to be known as The Haunted Cartridge. The second arc, The Moon Children, began from September 17 that same year until July 15, 2011, totaling 3,591,600 words and 382 minutes of footage from the arcs. Hall used a method of transmedia storytelling through a combination of YouTube videos, written chapters, and audience input to weave a story about a character named BEN – supposedly a malevolent spirit of a dead child – who haunts the author (referred to in the story as Jadusable) in a copy of The Legend of Zelda: Majora's Mask. The first arc is told in first-person, as the author comes to the audience (in this case, an online forum) for help figuring out this strange game he bought. The story went viral; with viewers praising the story's mysterious and frightening nature, as well as Hall's ability to deftly weave breadcrumbs and other hidden clues to keep readers on the hook and guessing about the multiple theories that surrounded the story. The original story ends on a cliffhanger, with the readers themselves inadvertently helping unleash BEN onto the internet at large through sharing of the files that were given to them, supposedly by Jadusable.

However, by decoding a secret hidden cipher in Hall's YouTube account, investigative readers gained access to a website that led to the story's second arc, known as Moon Children. Despite it taking the appearance of an ordinary mid-2000s website, similar to Angelfire, readers were able to find hidden URLs and secret conversations between the website's users, depicting a narrative that the website was home to a Doomsday cult that was stuck in a time loop similar to the one serving as the main mechanic of Majora's Mask, with the website resetting itself every three days. Information found on the website on the third day could then be used by readers, either through online methods such as emails or by submitting videos of users playing specific songs from both The Legend of Zelda: Ocarina of Time and The Legend of Zelda: Majora's Mask, to unlock an alternate path on the first day after the website reset. This arc was ended on a cliffhanger, with Hall announcing a hiatus on July 15, 2011.

The story followed a strict publication schedule, with new content released over the course of two weeks, including videos posted on Hall's YouTube channel, themselves made using Project 64 and cheat codes taken from GameShark. The second arc was split into two separate parts, YSHDT (short for youshouldnthavedonethat.net) and Hubris, each of which covered a specific series of events. Upon its launch, the series garnered over 100,000 views in its first two days of publication; and as of 2020, it maintains a very high level of viewership, with over 2 million unique visitors in March, nearly eight years after completion of the first two arcs. In October 2017, Hall expressed interest in developing a third arc, also revealing he had anonymously created a second "popular" creepypasta series unrelated to Ben Drowned.

The third Ben Drowned arc, titled Awakening, began publication on March 17, 2020, coinciding with the 20th anniversary of The Legend of Zelda: Majora's Mask, with updates being provided every three days before settling into a weekly update schedule. This arc is split into three separate parts: Awakening, Methods of Revolution (incorporating elements of Hall's unmade feature-length film of the same name), and The Last Hero, a resurgence of the original format of video publication where the current author of the videos would upload them to Jadusable's YouTube channel. The third part details the events surrounding Sarah, a new player who is trying to free the trapped souls of characters new and old.

Background
Ben Drowned is set in a fictional, alternate universe closely following that of Earth prior to the emergence of a cult known as the Moon Children who worshiped the Moon, known to them as Luna. Sometime after the release of The Legend of Zelda: Majora's Mask, a twelve-year-old boy named 'Ben' was chosen as the experiment for a new project by the Moon Children. Coerced by them to join their group under the promise of having friends and being like his childhood hero, Link, Ben was soon unwillingly drowned in an attempted Moon Children ritual called ascension where the sacrifice becomes a prisoner of their own making, a catalyst for the cult to continue their plans. The resulting creation, named 'BEN', the original 'Ben' no longer having any physical control as the dominant mindset, is sealed inside a copy of Majora's Mask and merged with the programs within, before being subsequently watched over by an old man. The old man, in time, entrusts the cartridge to a random college sophomore student who bought it not knowing that it was a cursed object while several of the cult's members begin to continue their plan within the Internet, including a mysterious being, known as "Kelbris, The Father", who online takes the form of the Happy Mask Salesman. Ultimately, upon entering the Internet themselves, 'BEN' begins to wreak havoc on the sites and videos where the sophomore student, known as Jadusable, interacted all in service of "The Father".

The first and third arcs are set across the homes and locations, dealing with several college-age adults in multiple unspecified locations, set in the United States, and within the Internet, while the second arc is solely set within the Internet.

Plot summary

The Haunted Majora's Mask Cartridge

In September 2010, Jadusable is a college student who bought a suspicious Nintendo 64 cartridge labeled "Majora" (indicating it to be a copy of The Legend of Zelda: Majora's Mask) by a disconcerting old man at a garage sale, with the save data of former owner "Ben" still on it. As Jadusable plays the game, little inconsistencies begin to pop up, turning to outright glitches, leading Jadusable to go to the online site 4chan to post about his playing of the game as it unfolds. Playing as Link, Jadusable attempts different ways to modify the game out of curiosity. It reaches the point where he tries the day four glitch, a well-known glitch in the Majora's Mask community where you skip the third day's ending with the ability to explore the in-game world as depicted in the credits section. Causing the day four glitch breaks the normality of the game and Jadusable soon finds himself alone in Clock Town with all of the inhabitants gone, unable to advance the game by turning back time, while endlessly hearing the laugh of the Happy Mask Salesman. In an attempt to achieve a "Game Over" and return to the main menu, Jadusable forces Link to drown in a pond; when he does, Link clutches his head, screaming as in a mask animation, with the screen flashing to depict the Happy Mask Salesman, smiling and laughing. The game continues, and the "Song of healing" plays in reverse; a statue of Link is summoned, its face locked in an unblinking stare. The statue follows Jadusable's character, moving just outside of the camera's perspective, throughout the town. Jadusable tries to escape it, but nothing works. In desperation, Jadusable turns the camera to face the statue directly. After a while, the screen flashes back to the Happy Mask Salesman and Link, only the latter also turns this time. The Salesman, the statue, and Link all become locked in place, staring through the screen, directly at Jadusable.

Over the course of several sessions over a series of days, Jadusable writes in painstaking detail about each bizarre scenario he finds himself in, including spontaneously bursting into flames and lying unconscious (or dead) as the Majora-possessed Skull Kid looks on in silence. In a desperate attempt to return the cartridge to the old man who sold it to him, he sees the house empty, the old man's neighbor informing him that he has moved away. Jadusable, after hearing from the neighbor as to what happened in the house that the old man lived in, concludes that the cartridge is possessed by the spirit of its previous owner, a 12-year-old boy named Ben who had drowned almost eight years prior. Subsequently, a figure calling themselves "BEN" seemingly begins contacting him in and beyond the game itself, including changing his computer screen wallpaper to depict the Elegy of Emptiness and speaking through the online artificial intelligence Cleverbot. Using the Elegy statue as its physical form, BEN seems to take pride in being able to manipulate Jadusable, who subsequently describes a series of dreams about the Moon Children depicted in the game's finale, including himself physically transforming into the Elegy, and how he believes he saw the old man who sold him the cartridge on his street looking into his window. Eventually, BEN is revealed to have been hijacking Jadusable's computer and providing a false account of the story's narrative and resolution to 4chan and YouTube, using it to escape the cartridge onto the Internet, declaring "Now I am everywhere." A secret note from Jadusable after an apparent epilogue from his roommate Tyler (who accompanied Jadusable to the old man's former house after the first time he played the game) offers the "true" telling of events and references videos that were never published, seemingly because BEN had deleted them. After publishing his final account of the past week's events, called TheTruth.rtf, Jadusable is never seen again.

Moon Children
Two days after BEN's escape from the cartridge, a cult calling themselves the Moon Children reveal their existence to the world. An unnamed follower of Jadusable's story discovers a cipher on his YouTube channel that eventually leads them to the cult's official website, youshouldnthavedonethat.net, in which three moderators discuss the upcoming "ascension" of one of their members. A post by a fourth user and the website's administrator, named DROWNED (supposedly Mr. D), appears to speak directly to the follower through the avatar of a man wearing a gas mask. By exploring the various links, the follower discovers various details about the cult, including that the original Ben was apparently a member who had been sacrificed alongside several other individuals under the pretense of achieving ascension, that another member named Alex had recently betrayed them, and that they have their own prophecy of end times revolving around the Moon destroying the Earth (à la Majora's Mask), provided to them by their deceased prophet Kelbris in 1998. Kelbris, who similarly died under uncertain circumstances, is now seen within the cult as evidence of his own, successful 'ascension'. The next day, the users are able to contact the moderator "Rodney R" Ifrit, revealed to be "Matt Hubris", who answers several questions before disappearing, including referencing his siblings as Rosa and Ben; the original 'Ben' is confirmed as a member of the Moon Children who was sacrificed on April 23, 2002, via drowning, his body ascending to become the central home of 'BEN' in place of all other ascended members. Coinciding with the end of a countdown on a hidden page, a video of the Song of Time is uploaded as a video response to one of Jadusable's videos. Shortly afterward, their website collapses.

The following day, the website is reestablished in an unfinished glitching state, with posts from the previous incarnation being posted again with current dates, revealing that in-game actions from Majora's Mask have effects on the website. Over the following day, the follower uses in-game actions to advance the story, establishing contact with Rosa, the sister of Matt, whom Rosa says has disappeared, as well as the soon-to-be-ascended moderators Kevin F. "Insidiae", Christopher "Nekko" and Spencer L. "Duskworld23". However, as a result of the follower's actions, Rosa was taken away by a resurrected Kelbris, Alex was killed while working to prevent the actions of the cult, and time is reset again. Time is subsequently revealed to reset every three days, as in Majora's Mask. Alex, apparently resurrected by the reset of time, returns under the guise of "TheLinkMissing" with an additional warning before disappearing, apparently for good, as a result of careless player actions.

On October 6, the website undergoes several drastic design changes, signaling the return of the story. Through clever URL changes, the follower discovers several hidden files ranging from used assets to cryptic documents aimed directly at them. Their biggest discovery is found to be the 59th file, mhftt.txt, a final message left by Ifrit before his disappearance. This file names a fellow reader to the follower, Kayd "Ryukaki" Hendricks, who had been in contact with Rosa prior to her death, as having been warned by him as to be in danger. Over the next two days, Ryukaki uploads a series of videos indicating that his life is indeed at stake. As of 2020, the videos uploaded by Ryukaki are now seen as ambiguously canon with many of the things posted in the videos coinciding with the current arc but others never referenced again.

On November 8, another video uploaded on Jadusable's channel by BEN signals the beginning of the arc's epilogue, with the coming months seeing small changes made to the Moon Children website. On February 17, 2011, a new forum called Within Hubris is launched as a central hub for the follower and others like them during the next portion of the story. Shortly after its discovery, a hidden section of the forum was revealed to contain the spirits of former members of the Moon Children. Within a week of the site's discovery, the follower begins receiving newspaper clippings in their mail that detail an apparent murder-suicide that took place "three months [ago]" in New York, and including an apparent message from BEN. On February 26, another video is uploaded to Jadusable's channel, predicting the final warning for the following day. On February 27, a video, known as h b i s r e a l is uploaded featuring the interior of the house featured in the newspaper. Following those events, the arc, and the story in general, was put on hiatus by Alex Hall for an indefinite time.

Awakening

Two years after an unknown societal collapse in 2018, in March 2020, the YouTube channel formerly controlled by Jadusable and BEN is taken over by a resurgent "Jadus", who recounts the alternate history to have occurred in the time since the final ascension of "The Father", who was revealed to be Kelbris. The Father had killed Jadusable moments after the ending of The Haunted Cartridge arc, a moment shown in upload Kelbris.wmv. (Another unreleased video, CHILDREN.wmv, was also released around this point in time.) An as-of-yet unexplained event that occurred in 2012 apparently had global repercussions, leading to a modern-day Great Depression resulting in a total breakdown of American society by 2018. Addressing the follower, dubbed "The Second Player" (alternatively "The Main Character", or simply "The MC"), Jadus claims a partial cause of this collapse as being a mysterious virus known as "HEROES", of which they are a survivor, alongside their occupational partner Denton. The player is a prisoner in the mysterious Ethereal Hotel, through which he is guided by radio by another survivor, Abel, avoiding a gas mask-wearing entity known as "The Jailer", as they roam the halls. He is killed by The Jailer, and control is passed over to another person, named Sarah. She decides to stay and wait for a bit and is rewarded for doing so. Now in possession of a Nintendo 64, Sarah subsequently encounters the seemingly benevolent spirit of the original Ben within the original Nintendo 64 cartridge for whom she plays the Song of Healing, which in-game is used to mend broken souls. Now healed, Ben explains that after Jadusable awakened The Father, he remained within the cartridge, tormenting Ben and the litany of souls he had been manipulating into imprisoning in BEN, including Jadusable and Rosa. Eventually, the souls were forced to flee deep within the code of the cartridge, which in turn caused glitches to render the game unplayable. Ben begs her to heal the souls BEN has left to The Father's mercy, before granting her Link's adult form from The Legend of Zelda: Ocarina of Time. The "Adult Mask," he explains, contains the souls of a large number of people, all seeking revenge against The Father. She then plays the Song of Time, sending her back to the normal yet altered Majora's Mask gameplay from ten years ago.

After this, an overjoyed Abel resumes communication with Sarah and muses over the interaction. He then claims that the game has been reverted to its pre-Jadusable state and that BEN — which he explains to be the Behavioral Event Network — is a hive mind consisting of both the souls of Moon Children who have been successfully digitized and of various artificially intelligent programs from Majora's Mask which he believes gained sentience either from a lack of input or by some sort of trigger, with the entity being named after the original Ben as a tribute, due to their soul having been the first human soul to have been successfully digitized. He ends his monologue and then says Sarah's part in the experiment is over, explaining he will be "coming over" to relieve her of the cartridge, before suggesting she 'stick around' to see other things he wants to show her.

Despite Abel's request, Sarah continues playing the game. In place of the Happy Mask Salesman, she finds Ifrit in the form of an unused NPC, who tells her that Ben has been "restored" into his enslaved state, and that to defeat the Father she needs to disrupt the simulation or replicate the same "fourth-day" glitch that freed Ben. When she exits the area, she is suddenly confronted by two duplicates of the first boss of Majora's Mask, which she easily dispenses before continuing deeper into the game.

Sarah eventually encounters a Moon Child, who asks her to leave its "home". When she pursues it, she finds in its place a heart, which she collects. Ifrit then contacts her saying she must collect 3 hearts to free the souls trapped within the cartridge. Progressing further, she is confronted by several more Moon Children, who are seen apparently tormenting another NPC. After thwarting their attack, Sarah encounters this NPC, who now claims to be Rosa, who as thanks gives her a pendant containing her memories which she claims will be able to free the others. She continues onwards, finding a second Moon Child's heart and encountering another NPC who "knows exactly who he is" and thinks of Sarah as a monster, due to all the souls contained in the mask making her seem like a monster consuming them.

On August 23, 2020, a new video called The Showdown.wmv premiered, the contents giving another revelation to the story. Sarah, after escaping the clutches of one of the Moon Children, meets the once thought dead Jadusable, the original player from the Haunted Cartridge arc. Dismayed, Jadusable is discovered to now be working with The Father and after facing Sarah in one on one combat, kills her, leaving the story without a player character. The same video at the end shows a link to a new site called the Eternity Project, a web page established by those who belong to a group of people called The Family with the purpose of achieving ascension to escape the world-ending event due to happen in 2020. On that website, users were able to confirm the current status of many of the characters from the entire story such as Sarah, Jadusable, and Rosa. The site promises prospective members to join the Eternity Project and to escape from the hell of the current world and embrace a new future through ascension, becoming Enlightened and free from the world. As is the tradition in sites belonging to this story, members could dig into source codes and puzzle-solving to discover hidden messages and pages. Here, Abel eventually contacted players (or rather, a "pity hire" at the Eternity Project) and gave them passwords allowing access to the 'heart' of World Alpha - now known to be the Haunted Cartridge, which all of the Eternity Project's subsequent virtual worlds are apparently built off of. Here, players were met with an option to upload "code" directly into the heart of World Alpha — an action which Abel hoped would stop the virtual world from imploding, along with the rest of the Eternity Project and everyone still trapped within.

Eventually, one of the players' uploads was accepted and the option to upload anything further disappeared. The uploaded code would successfully revive Sarah in Clock Town, albeit without the Ocarina of Time or the Adult form she previously had, with only 12 in-game hours remaining before the Moon would crash into Termina and start the entire game over again. Noticing that Clock Town is empty, she attempts to enter the buildings in the area, but all but one are inaccessible. Upon entering this building, Sarah finds herself in the code with Rosa and the rest of the humans digitized into Majora's Mask. They argue over whether to let the Moon fall and just reset everything, which Rosa believes will not result in what the rest expects it to, or to allow Sarah to perform the day four glitch, at the risk of unleashing the already looming Father all over again. Ultimately, Sarah races to the Observatory and prepares to perform the glitch — however, the choice to actually do it is left up to the players.

The players chose to perform the glitch, and after having done so, the world returns to a glitched state. Ifrit suddenly reappears and explains that by doing the glitch, she has killed the game's inhabitants and that with the Father freed once more, he intends to use his power to transform the world into a "nightmare". Clock Town becomes filled with cultic worshippers of the Father as Sarah runs to the clock tower, where she finds Jadusable and a newly freed Ben hiding. Jadusable explains that he was trying to stop Sarah from performing the glitch, and admonishes her for simply believing everything that the game's inhabitants had told her. He explains that Alex had passed the responsibility of being World Alpha's protector to him - and that now - he was going to do the same to her. Jadusable gives up his soul and joins his strength with Sarah, turning her back into Adult Link. Sarah confronts Ifrit, now joined by the last remaining Moon Child, and briefly battles the latter as it assumes the form of Majora's Wrath — the third phase of the final boss of Majora's Mask. Suddenly, instead of fighting back, Sarah uses her ocarina to play the Song of Healing, and Majora's Wrath suddenly disappears. Ifrit briefly reappears to threaten her, but he is suddenly overcome with static and disappears himself. The Father appears in his place, demanding Sarah explain her actions. In response, she gives him the Pendant of Memories, and Circle explains that the inhabitants of World Alpha are just scared, and only want to live. In response, The Father 'changes his parameters' to heal World Alpha, by removing all "anomalies" which wish to harm the natural order of the world. He also explains that, as users interfacing with World Alpha's code, they too will be removed, and that to pacify the inhabitants' mental traumas he will need to reset their memories as well. Above all, The Father assures Sarah and Circle that World Alpha will continue and that Ben will be given a real host body, commenting that his imprisonment within the Elegy statue was an "oversight" made by dated A.I. When Circle asks what will become of Sarah after The Father 'removes' her, he says he doesn't know and fades away. Sarah fades away soon after.

The series ends with a shot of Ben, now in the body of Child Link, standing next to a now unpossessed Elegy statue and waving to the audience.

Reception
Ben Drowned has received favorable reviews. It received substantial attention following a favorable review by Kotaku writer Owen Good roughly two months into publication, who praised the story's themes and originality. Readership quadrupled following this article, and again by its followup in 2017 while the story was in its first hiatus, in which its biblical themes and use of the five stages of grief and "ghost within the machine" trope were praised, as was Hall's initial decision to end the narrative with an April Fool's Day joke in 2012.

The series has been favorably compared to the similarly popular creepypasta series Marble Hornets. Matt Freeman of Vice, comparing Ben Drowned to both Majora's Mask and The Legend of Zelda: Breath of the Wild, referred to it as "a shining example of how Zelda fans have always been in lockstep with Nintendo's own experimentation with horror. [being] a well-told story", as well as praising its unique take on the found footage genre. Anthony Vigna of Nintendojo praised the "videos to back up its claims and provided blog updates that pushed the tale to be more believable", calling Majora's Mask "the perfect game to create the setting of a scary story", with the ARG elements of the story praised as being highly addictive.

Ryan Larson of Bloody Disgusting praised how "with clever video editing skills and a deep wealth of knowledge, the online user Jadusable is able to craft one of the scariest legends of recent memory. Like storytellers before him, using paintings or ink to craft the tale, he uses the devices of our advanced time to make something that the kids of the nineties can latch onto." Kara Dennison of Fanbyte, speaking of Ben Drowned in context of the 20th anniversary of Majora's Mask, praised "what Hall did during this time [as] both unique and effective. He took a concept that was already gaining steam and gave it a reality it was lacking. Creepypastas about Mickey Mouse and The Simpsons were already poking at people’s childhoods, occasionally with attempts at “haunted tapes” to back the stories up. But BEN Drowned brought a level of realism to its story that had yet to be accomplished in other attempts.", additionally citing how it was stated as the primary inspiration for later popular works such as Petscop by Tony Domenico, and concluding that of creepasta, "[it's] highly likely BEN Drowned will remain the best of its kind."

Blogger Robbie Blair discussed Ben Drowned within the context of the increasing popularity of web serials and alternate reality games such as Worm. In September 2014, concept art for the episode "Soos and the Real Girl" of Gravity Falls revealed Ben Drowned as a primary influence behind the character GIFfany; themselves an inspiration for the Doki Doki Literature Club! character Monika. Clive Barker and Warner Brothers have approached Hall to discuss adapting Ben Drowned. An independent film adaptation of the series titled Darkland: Ben Drowned, produced by Mind's Eye Entertainment and starring Jonny Clarke, began filming in 2015, but ultimately was not completed. In August 2016, a press release for Syfy's Channel Zero referenced Ben Drowned as one of the urban legends that would form the basis for a future season; ultimately, the series was cancelled after its fourth season.

Themes
Eric Van Allen of entertainment site Kotaku on the place of Ben Drowned in the developing creepypasta and emergence into urban legend:

Ben Drowned persists. The Elegy statue has become permanently linked to the story of Jadusable and his haunted cartridge, a copy of Majora's Mask that inspired nightmares of masks being sewn to faces and terrible, terrible fates. Ben Drowned lives by the virtual firelight, as each new whisper, tweet, or forum post sends chills down a new reader’s spine. Creepypastas are the ghost stories of the digital age, changing with each retelling and reimagining from its fandom. Though Ben Drowned owes its legacy to Hall, its future lies in the hands of anyone who might take to their keyboard to add a new page.

The originally unofficial title Ben Drowned has multiple potential meanings. It has been connected to the protagonist's character development, the fate of the child Ben and the subsequently created omnipresent force BEN; drawing a parallel with the power of the Moon Children cult to control the actions of one's soul in the eyes of Luna and the tides of the ocean. The arc titles also generally have double meanings. Several reviewers have described the serial as an exercise in repeatedly escalating the stakes of the story, with a number of reviewers having noted the characters' ingenuity, and the original and creative use of Roman and The Legend of Zelda mythology in the narrative.

The series received renewed focus in 2016, when 12-year-old Katelyn Davis, who had recently committed suicide, was cited as having been catfished by a user embodying the BEN persona from Ben Drowned, after which a statement in reference to the end of their relationship was accompanied by a piece of fanart of the character in their later form of a Link with blood-red eyes beckoning a violet fairy. Addressing their death in relation to his series, Hall stated himself:For the sequel Awakening in 2020, Hall incorporated machine-learning programs to create artwork and music for his story, going so far as to have the titular villain - which was itself an in-universe AI construct - created entirely by artificial intelligence using Artbreeder. Hall expressed enthusiasm for these emerging AI tools, citing that they could expand the possibilities available to independent creators, but urged caution that these tools would quickly render many artists/creators obsolete.

References

External links

Methods of Revolution
Eternity Project

Novels first published online
Horror fiction web series
Fictional cults
Novels first published in serial form
2010s science fiction novels
2010s horror novels
Creepypasta
Alternate history novels
Alternate reality games
Debut science fiction novels
Debut horror novels
2010 debut novels
Self-published books
Internet memes introduced in 2010
Self-reflexive works